Voluntary Target is a 1984 compilation LP album by guitarist Leo Kottke.  It includes all of Balance and Burnt Lips.

Track list
Record 1 Balance
Side A:
 "Tell Mary" - 3:04
 "I Don't Know Why" - 2:07
 "Embryonic Journey" (Jorma Kaukonen) - 3:17
 "Disguise" - 2:45
 "Whine" - 3:10
Side B:
 "Losing Everything" - 2:58
 "Drowning" - 2:12
 "Dolores" - 3:09
 "1/2 Acre of Garlic" - 2:33
 "Learning the Game" (Buddy Holly) - 3:16
Record 2 Burnt Lips
Side A:
 "Endless Sleep" (Nick Lowe) - 3:37
 "Cool Water" (Bob Nolan) - 2:25
 "Frank Forgets" - 2:09
 "Sonora's Death Row" (Kevin Blackie Farrell) - 4:30
 "The Quiet Man" - 2:05
 "Everybody Lies" - 2:19
 "I Called Back" - 2:38
Side B:
 "A Low Thud" - 3:07
 "Orange Room" - 3:33
 "The Credits: Out-takes from Terry's Movie" - 3:46
 "Voluntary Target" - 2:58
 "Burnt Lips" - 2:07
 "Sand Street" - 1:46
 "The Train and the Gate: From Terry's Movie" - 3:18

All songs by Leo Kottke except as noted

Personnel
 Leo Kottke - 6- & 12-string guitars, electric guitar, vocals
 Kenneth Buttrey - drums, clavinet
 Mike Leech - bass
 Bobby Ogdin & John Harris - piano

External links
 Leo Kottke official site
 Unofficial Leo Kottke web site (fan site)

Leo Kottke compilation albums
1984 compilation albums